Cannabis in Myanmar (Burma) is illegal, but is illicitly cultivated, and was previously legal from 1939 onward.

History
During the British Empire rule in Myanmar (then known as Burma), cannabis was banned in 1870 (or 1874). However, despite the ban, there was a high demand for cannabis, particularly among Indian workers in the country. Recognizing this ongoing demand, the Burmese government legalized and taxed cannabis in 1939. This move was primarily aimed at regulating the sale and consumption of the drug and generating revenue for the government.

The legalization of cannabis in Myanmar led to the establishment of government-run dispensaries that sold the drug to users. The dispensaries were established in major cities like Yangon, Mandalay, and Rangoon. However, the dispensaries faced several challenges, including poor quality of cannabis and corruption among government officials. As a result, the demand for cannabis continued to be met through the black market.

After Myanmar gained independence from British rule in 1948, the government continued to regulate the sale and consumption of cannabis through the Opium Law of 1948. The law prohibited the possession and sale of cannabis without a license, which was granted only to registered users with a medical prescription. Despite this regulation, the demand for cannabis continued to grow in the country.

In recent years, Myanmar has faced significant challenges related to drug trafficking, including the cultivation and export of cannabis. The government has taken steps to combat drug trafficking, including the destruction of cannabis fields and the arrest of drug traffickers. However, the problem persists, and the country continues to face challenges related to drug abuse and addiction.

References

Myanmar
Drugs in Myanmar